Midnight and the Meaning of Love, originally known as Midnight 2: Word is Bond, is a novel by Sister Souljah that was published by Atria/Simon & Schuster on April 12, 2011. It was originally scheduled to be published on November 2, 2010, and it continues the story begun in Midnight: A Gangster Love Story.

Midnight travels to Japan in order to reunite with his wife Akemi Nakamura and bring her back to New York. She was taken away from him by her father, Naoko, a very successful businessman and minor celebrity in Japan, who does not approve of their union.

References

Novels by Sister Souljah
2011 American novels
Atria Publishing Group books
Urban fiction